Janez Krstnik Verbetz  was a politician in the early 17th century in Slovenia when the country was under the Holy Roman Empire. He became mayor of Ljubljana in 1623. He was succeeded by Jurij Viditsch in 1624.

References

Mayors of places in the Holy Roman Empire
Mayors of Ljubljana
Year of birth missing
Year of death missing
17th-century Slovenian politicians